The Receiver General of Jamaica was the public official in Jamaica responsible for receiving and disbursing money of the Government of Jamaica.

The receiver was able to appoint a number of deputies to work on his behalf.

List of Receivers General of Jamaica
Note: This list is incomplete. Dates are dates of life, not dates in office unless otherwise stated.
 James Knight (fl. 1725–1745)
 Thomas Graham
 Robert Graham (c.1735-1797), appointed 1752.
 James Mitchell (1796)
 William Mitchell (1742–1823)
 Hinton East
 Jasper Hall (died 1798)
 Charles Sackville-Germain, 5th Duke of Dorset (1767–1843), in office 1776–1815

References 

Political office-holders in Jamaica
Colony of Jamaica
Receiver Generals of Jamaica
Taxation in Jamaica
Economic history of Jamaica